Ramsgate is a village on the south coast of KwaZulu-Natal in South Africa, just southwest of Margate. Ramsgate is located on the mouth of a river known by the Zulu name Bilanhlolo ("the marvellous boiler") for the bubbles caused by strong currents making it look like the water is boiling. In 1922, there was only one person living there, Paul Buck, a painter and violin maker and he called the place Blue Lagoon.

Infrastructure

Roads 
Ramsgate has access to one highway, the R61 freeway (future N2 Wild Coast Toll Route). The R61/N2 (South Coast Toll Road) runs past Ramsgate bypassing the village to the west. The freeway links the village to Port Shepstone and Durban in the north-east and Southbroom and Port Edward in the south-west. Access to Ramsgate from the R61/N2 is obtained through the Alford Avenue (Exit 29) interchange. 

The R620 (Marine Drive) runs along the coast linking Ramsgate to the nearby coastal towns of Margate, Uvongo, Shelly Beach and Port Shepstone in the north-east and Southbroom and Port Edward (via the R61) in the south-west. The R620 can also be used as an alternative route to Shelly Beach, Port Shepstone, Durban and Kokstad (via the R102 in Port Shepstone) for motorists avoiding the Izotsha Ramp Plaza in Shelly Beach and the Oribi Toll Plaza in Port Shepstone.

'Alford Avenue' is a small secondary road which starts at the intersection with the R620 in Ramsgate’s Central Business District (CBD) and links Ramsgate to the R61/N2, Southcity Christian School and Izotsha Road (to Southbroom and Izotsha).

References

Populated places in the Ray Nkonyeni Local Municipality
Populated coastal places in South Africa